Yagudino (Yähüźä) is a rural locality (a village) in Nauruzovsky Selsoviet, Uchalinsky District, Bashkortostan, Russia. The population was 26 as of 2010. There is 1 street.

Geography 
Yagudino is located 67 km southwest of Uchaly (the district's administrative centre) by road. Nauruzovo is the nearest rural locality.

References 

Rural localities in Uchalinsky District